Edmund Otis Hovey (15 July 1801 – 10 March 1877), D.D. was an American Presbyterian minister and Wabash College founder.  He was born in East Hanover, N.H., July 15, 1801. At twenty-one years of age he began his preparation for preaching the gospel, at Thetford Academy; in 1828 graduated from Dartmouth College, and in 1831 from Andover Theological Seminary. He was ordained by the Presbytery of Newburyport the same year, and sent as a missionary to Wabash, Indiana. His great work was in founding and building up Wabash College, Crawfordsville, Indiana, of which, in 1834, he was appointed financial agent and professor of rhetoric. Subsequently, he was made professor of chemistry, mineralogy, and geology. He was also treasurer and librarian. He died there, March 10, 1877. See (N.Y.) Evangelist, March 29, 1877.

External links 
 Biographical history of Massachusetts
 Edmund Otis Hovey collection, Rare Books and Manuscripts, Indiana State Library

1801 births
1877 deaths
American Presbyterian ministers
American Presbyterian missionaries
Wabash College faculty
American librarians
19th-century American clergy